The Monument to a water supply system is a bronze monument which was open in Pokrovsky Square of Rostov-on-Don opposite to city Musical theater.

Description 
As a material for the production of a monumental bronze was chosen. A height of a monument reaches 2,2 meters. On plans of authors, the monument is made in the form of the woman who is dressed as the resident of the 19th century. It gathers water in a bucket from a water column. Such symbol was chosen not accidentally — at that time, according to established orders, the woman was responsible for providing a family with drinking water, therefore, emergence in the city of a water supply system significantly facilitated household tasks of women. The monument was made in honor of the first water supply system in the city which earned in 1865. The Rostov water utility initiated the creation of a monument. The sculptor Sergey Oleshnya became one of the authors of a monument.

As directed the mayor of Rostov Mikhail Chernyshev, a ceremonial opening of a monument to the first water supply system in the city took place in August 2007. The opening ceremony was begun with the bright dramatized action, fancy-dress numbers which subject was a history of the first Rostov water supply system were shown. The actor representing Andrey Baykov at whom the city water supply system began to work acted. At the opening, there was a chief of the Rostov municipal government of culture Lyudmila Lisitsina, the executive director of the Russian association of water supply and water disposal Alexey Golovachev.

References 

Tourist attractions in Rostov-on-Don
Monuments and memorials in Rostov-on-Don